United Nations Security Council Resolution 245, adopted on January 25, 1968, after the government of the Republic of South Africa refused to comply with a General Assembly resolution 2324 and continued to illegally try detainees from South West Africa, the Council demanded that those prisoners be released and repatriated and invited all states to exert their influence in order to induce the South Africans government to comply with the resolution.

The resolution was adopted unanimously.

See also
History of Namibia
List of United Nations Security Council Resolutions 201 to 300 (1965–1971)

References
Text of the Resolution at undocs.org

External links
 

 0245
20th century in South Africa
 0245
 0245
January 1968 events